The Tana River cisticola (Cisticola restrictus) is a species of bird in the family Cisticolidae. It is found in Kenya and there is speculation that it may also be found in Somalia.

Its natural habitat is subtropical or tropical moist shrubland.

References

Tana River cisticola
Endemic birds of Kenya
Tana River (Kenya)
Tana River cisticola
Tana River cisticola
Controversial bird taxa
Taxonomy articles created by Polbot
Northern Zanzibar–Inhambane coastal forest mosaic